The 2001 Liga Indonesia Premier Division Final was a football match which was played on 7 October 2001 at Gelora Bung Karno Stadium in Jakarta. It was contested by PSM Makassar and Persija Jakarta to determine the winner of the 2001 Liga Indonesia Premier Division. Persija won the match 3–2 to claim their first-ever professional title.

Road to the final

Match details

References

External links
Liga Indonesia Premier Division standings

2001